WGEO-LP (105.7 FM, "Georgetown Emergency Operations Radio") is a low-power radio station licensed to Georgetown, South Carolina, United States. Currently owned by the Georgetown City Fire Department, the station broadcasts emergency messages when necessary, as well as visitors' information for Georgetown-area attractions all other times.

References

External links
 Information at Georgetown City Fire Department website
 

GEO-LP
GEO-LP
News and talk radio stations in the United States
Georgetown County, South Carolina